Valley Yellow Pages is owned by AGI Publishing, Inc., and is an independent Yellow Pages directory publisher serving 45 markets in Northern and Central California.  An independent Yellow Pages publisher is a company that publishes Yellow Pages directories as alternatives to the local phone companies.  The independent directories include similar headings and advertisements, and are distributed to local households and businesses in the market areas.  Advertisements are sold to local businesses as an alternative choice to the traditional phone companies.  This helps to keep local market Yellow Pages advertising costs down.

Valley Yellow Pages is headquartered in Fresno, CA with employees throughout Northern and Central California.  The company publishes 6.4 million directories annually and reaches more than 14.8 million households and businesses across their 45 different markets.  Valley Yellow Pages is the largest independent directory publisher in Northern California and the third largest independent publisher in the nation.

History

AGI Publishing, Inc. was founded by three former Pacific Bell executives in 1985. It was established on the principle of bringing direct competition to the Yellow Pages marketplace.  For years, utility companies held a monopoly on the marketplace. Valley Yellow Pages was created to provide consumers with a better product and advertisers with substantial advertising savings.

In 1987, AGI Publishing began operations as Valley Yellow Pages and established corporate offices in Fresno, California. The first directory, serving the communities of Fresno and Clovis, was published in 1988. The company currently employs more than 180 people throughout Northern and Central California.

Directories
Valley Yellow Pages currently publishes the following 45 directories:

Production

Valley Yellow Pages print directories include Yellow Pages.  The art work and composition of the Yellow Pages are produced by ASEC International, a provider of graphic design and advertising development services.

Directories are printed by RR Donnelley, a full-service provider of print services and Yellow Pages directories.

Distribution
Distribution of Valley Yellow Pages directories occurs in two ways – Initial and newcomer delivery.  Initial delivery distributes Yellow Pages directories door-to-door free of charge to businesses and households throughout specific market areas. Newcomer delivery occurs throughout the year, as businesses and residents relocate into the area.  Directories are also available free of charge at local Chambers of Commerce, local Valley Yellow Pages sales offices or by calling a toll free number.

Consumers may opt out of distribution by visiting yellowpagesoptout.org.

MyYP.com

MyYP.com is Valley Yellow Pages' Internet Yellow Pages directory. It was launched in 2007 with the same user friendly format of their printed Yellow Pages. The Internet format allows advertisers to provide enhanced features to their listings that are not possible in the print format.

Due to the nature of the online medium, additional advertiser information can be included online to enhance advertising listings such as company profiles, links to company websites, printable coupons and easy to follow maps. In early 2009, features were added to include click to call and mobile access.

Environmental concerns
In recent years, the Yellow Pages industry has faced scrutiny from environmentalist groups and bloggers who claim printed Yellow Pages are a wasteful resource.  This is despite studies that show Yellow Pages usage remains strong. According to a Knowledge Networks study, 71% of respondents indicated they referenced their Yellow Pages directory within the last 30 days.

While Yellow Pages print directories remain a valuable resource for consumers and advertisers, Valley Yellow Pages is making a strong effort to make them more environmentally conscious. Each directory is 100% recyclable, uses 100% non-toxic glue, is printed with inks containing soy and/or vegetable oils and is made from paper that is 100% certified to come from sustainable managed forests. 100% of the fiber used in each directory is harvested in a sustainable way under the BC Forest Practices and Range Act.

See also
 Electronic Yellow Pages
 List of yellow pages

References

Companies based in Fresno, California
Publishing companies established in 1985
Telephone directory publishing companies of the United States
American companies established in 1985